Kumbakonam block is a community development block in the Kumbakonam taluk of Thanjavur District, Tamil Nadu, India. There are a total of 47 villages in this block. The block is surrounded by the Thirumanur and T.Palur blocks of Ariyalur District to the north, Thiruvidaimarudur and Thiruppanandal blocks of Thanjavur District to the east and Tiruvarur block of Tiruvarur District to the south and Papanasam block of Thanjavur district to the west. It is one of the six blocks of Thanjavur district watered by the Kaveri River.

List of Panchayat Villages

Notes

References 

 
 

Revenue blocks of Thanjavur district